Myślibórz is a city in West Pomeranian Voivodeship (north-west Poland).

Myślibórz may also refer to:

Myślibórz, Lower Silesian Voivodeship (south-west Poland)
Myślibórz, Łódź Voivodeship (central Poland)
Myślibórz, Greater Poland Voivodeship (west-central Poland)